Syasstroy is a town in Volkhovsky District of Leningrad Oblast, Russia, located near the mouth of the Syas River, at its confluence with the Valgonka, close to Lake Ladoga,  east of St. Petersburg. Population:

History

Before 1926, a small village of Nosok existed at this location. An urban-type settlement was founded in 1926, as construction of pulp-and-paper mill started. At the time, it belonged to Volkhovsky Uyezd of Leningrad Governorate. On August 1, 1927, the uyezds were abolished and Volkhovsky District was established. The governorates were also abolished and the district became a part of Leningrad Okrug of Leningrad Oblast. On March 20, 1946, Novoladozhsky District with the administrative center located in Novaya Ladoga was split off Volkhovsky District and Syasstroy became a part of this district. On February 1, 1963, Novoladozhsky District was abolished and merged into Volkhovsky District.

Syasstroy was granted town status in 1992.

Administrative and municipal status
Within the framework of administrative divisions, it is, together with ten rural localities, incorporated within Volkhovsky District as Syasstroyskoye Settlement Municipal Formation. As a municipal division, Syasstroyskoye Settlement Municipal Formation is incorporated within Volkhovsky Municipal District as Syasstroyskoye Urban Settlement.

Economy

Industry
The economy of Syasstroy is dependent on just one enterprise, the paper mill, which makes it potentially very vulnerable to economic crises.

Transportation
The M18 Highway, connecting St. Petersburg with Murmansk, passes through Syasstroy. A road connects Syasstroy with Kolchanovo, on the highway heading to Vologda via Tikhvin and Cherepovets.

The railway connecting St. Petersburg and Murmansk runs several kilometers east of Syasstroy. The closest station is in Kolchanovo.

In the beginning of the 19th century, a system of canals bypassing Lake Ladoga were built, which at the time were a part of Mariinsky Water System, connecting the Neva River and the Volga River. In particular, the Syas Canal connects the Syas and the Volkhov, and the Svir Canal connects the Syas and the Svir. The canals collectively are known as the Ladoga Canal.

Culture and recreation
The district contains one cultural heritage monument of federal significance and additionally three objects classified as cultural and historical heritage of local significance. The federal monument is the tomb of the author Sergey Semyonov, who died in 1942 in Syasstroy Military Hospital from pneumonia. The local monuments are two tombs of soldiers fallen during World War II and a house where Sergey Kirov stayed when he visited the construction place of the paper mill.

References

Notes

Sources

Cities and towns in Leningrad Oblast
Cities and towns built in the Soviet Union
Populated places established in 1926
Volkhovsky District
Novoladozhsky Uyezd